Douglas Gordon Ross (born 27 January 1983) is a Scottish politician who has served as Leader of the Scottish Conservative Party since 2020. He has served as Member of Parliament (MP) for Moray since 2017. In addition to his seat in Westminster, he serves as a Member of the Scottish Parliament (MSP) for the Highlands and Islands having been elected in 2021. He was previously MSP for the region from 2016 to 2017.

Born in Aberdeen, Ross was educated at Forres Academy. After graduating from the Scottish Agricultural College, he worked on a dairy farm. A member of the Scottish Liberal Democrats in his youth, he switched to the Scottish Conservatives and began his political career as a Scottish Parliament researcher and then a councillor in Moray. He stood unsuccessfully for the Moray UK Parliament constituency in the 2010 and 2015 general elections and for the Scottish Parliament constituency in 2011 and 2016. In the latter election, he was elected as a regional list MSP as one of the additional members for the Highlands and Islands.

Ross was elected to the House of Commons at the 2017 general election, defeating SNP deputy leader Angus Robertson, and was re-elected in 2019 with a reduced majority. He served as Parliamentary Under-Secretary of State for Scotland under Prime Minister Boris Johnson for six months. He resigned in May 2020, in protest at Dominic Cummings continuing to serve as Johnson's adviser after breaking lockdown rules during the COVID-19 pandemic.

Following the resignation of Jackson Carlaw in July 2020, Ross announced his candidature in the August 2020 Scottish Conservative Party leadership election. Five days later, he was elected leader unopposed. He ran on a joint ticket with former Scottish Conservative leader Ruth Davidson. Since he served in the House of Commons and was not an MSP, Davidson led the party in the Scottish Parliament until the 2021 Scottish Parliament election.

Ross has announced that he will not seek re-election as an MP at the next general election.

Early life and career
Douglas Gordon Ross was born in Aberdeen on 27 January 1983 to Sandy and Lesley Ross. In childhood he first attended Alves Primary School and the state secondary Forres Academy before going on to study Agriculture at the Scottish Agricultural College. After graduating, he worked on a dairy farm near Forres, Moray, where his father had been working as a cattleman. He was a member of the Scottish Liberal Democrats in his youth but later became a Conservative voter.

Early political career
Ross began his political career when he took up a post as a parliamentary researcher at the Scottish Parliament. He was first elected to The Moray Council in 2007, representing the Fochabers-Lhanbryde ward, and became part of the Independent/Conservative administration. He resigned from the council administration in December 2009 but continued as a councillor. In 2012, he was re-elected to The Moray Council and again became part of the ruling administration group but was "ousted" from this in 2014, following a debate about school closures.

Ross stood as the Conservative candidate for Moray at the 2010 and 2015 general elections, coming second to Angus Robertson but increased his share of the vote by 5.0% in 2015. He also stood as the Conservative candidate for the Moray Scottish Parliament constituency at the 2011 Scottish Parliament election but finished second to Richard Lochhead. At the 2016 Scottish Parliament election, Ross increased his vote by 18.0% but again finished behind Lochhead. However, he was elected to the Scottish Parliament after being placed first on the Highlands and Islands regional list. He supported the UK remaining within the European Union in the 2016 membership referendum.

Ross stood again for the seat of Moray at the 2017 general election, challenging SNP deputy leader Angus Robertson. He was successful in overturning Robertson's 9,065 majority with 22,637 votes, 47.6% of the votes cast, gaining a 16.5% swing to the Conservatives. Having gained a seat at Westminster, Ross resigned from his seat in the Scottish Parliament.

In 2017, Ross said during an interview that if he was Prime Minister for a day "without any repercussions", he would "like to see tougher enforcement against Gypsy Travellers". His remark was criticised, including by Naomi McAuliffe of Amnesty International. Ross apologised for his use of language. The Scottish Football Association launched a disciplinary investigation into his remarks, which did not lead to any formal disciplinary action, but warned him to pay attention to his use of language.

SNP and Labour spokespeople criticised Ross for missing a debate on Universal Credit in October 2017, due to his commitments as a football referee. Shortly afterwards, Ross decided he would no longer accept referee appointments while the UK Parliament is sitting.

Despite backing remaining in the EU prior to the referendum, Ross stated Parliament should complete Brexit to "deliver the will of the British people". He voted against Theresa May's Brexit withdrawal agreement at the first round of voting and was absent for the second following his wife going into labour. He supported Mark Harper then subsequently Boris Johnson in the 2019 Conservative Party leadership election.

Ross was re-elected at the 2019 general election with a reduced majority. He was then appointed Parliamentary Under-Secretary of State for Scotland, replacing Colin Clark who had lost his seat in the election.

Leadership of the Scottish Conservatives 

Ross announced his candidature in the August 2020 Scottish Conservative Party leadership election following Jackson Carlaw's resignation on 30 July 2020. On 5 August, he won the contest unopposed and became leader. On 11 August, he conducted a reshuffle where he made Ruth Davidson the Leader of the Conservative Party in the Scottish Parliament, dismissed Annie Wells and Liam Kerr from their deputy leadership positions and did not give Carlaw a position. As a result of the Alex Salmond parliamentary inquiry in early 2021, Ross called on opposition parties to pass a motion of no confidence against the Scottish Government.

Upon becoming leader, Ross announced plans to run for a seat in the 2021 Scottish Parliament election and succeed Davidson as his party's leader in Holyrood. He was subsequently elected on the Highlands and Islands regional list. The Scottish Conservatives won 31 seats in total, matching their 2016 result and recording the party's highest ever vote share. Following his re-election to the Scottish Parliament, Ross announced his intention to remain MP for Moray while serving as an MSP. The Scottish Parliament website confirms that Ross will donate his MSP salary to charities. Other parties have called on him to resign from his MP role.

In November 2021, Ross referred himself to the parliamentary watchdog after it was revealed he failed to record his salary and earnings as a linesman in his registers of interest at the UK Parliament, all of which amounted to £28,000 not being recorded. He subsequently apologised for his actions and said it was an error on his part however there were also calls for his resignation because of the affair.

In January 2022, after Ross called for the resignation of Prime Minister Boris Johnson amid the Downing Street party scandal, Jacob Rees-Mogg, Leader of the House of Commons, commented: "I don't think Douglas Ross is a big figure. I think Alister Jack is a really serious and senior figure." It was then reported that Ross had sent in a letter of no-confidence in Boris Johnson to the 1922 Committee. Less than two months later, in response to the  invasion of Ukraine, Ross announced that he had withdrawn his letter, saying “the middle of an international crisis is not the time to be discussing resignations”. Despite this, he was one of four of the six Scottish Conservative MPs who voted against Johnson in the  June confidence vote, though stressed he had not resubmitted his letter.

After poor results in the 2022 Scottish local elections, Ross said he intended to remain as leader.

Policies and views
In line with the Scottish Conservatives, Ross supports British unionism and is opposed to a second referendum on Scottish independence. Following his election as leader of the Scottish Conservative Party, Ross stated that he wanted to represent "working-class unionists in Scotland." However, he has also criticised what he views as too much centralisation around London and has expressed support for some federalist ideas, including House of Lords reform. In the run-up to the 2021 Scottish Parliament election, Ross proposed a "pro-UK, anti-referendum coalition" with other Scottish unionist parties although this was not supported by Scottish Labour.

Ross backed Remain during the EU referendum, but after the vote he stated Parliament should complete Brexit to "deliver the will of the British people". He voted against Theresa May's Brexit withdrawal agreement at the first round of voting and was absent for the second following his wife going into labour. During the 2019 Conservative Party leadership election, Ross initially endorsed Mark Harper before backing Boris Johnson in the final round.

Ross has also expressed support for power of recall in the Scottish parliament, and in 2021 proposed what he called "Mackay's Law" (named after former SNP Finance Minister Derek Mackay), whereby MSPs who have not shown up for work for over six months but still collect pay must be forced to resign.

Football referee
A qualified football official, Ross is a top-level assistant referee in his spare time. He was one of the officials for the 2015 Scottish Cup Final, assisting Willie Collum, and the 2018 Scottish Cup Final, assisting Kevin Clancy. He has run the line in several editions of Scotland's biggest club fixture, the Old Firm Derby, and has been involved in continental UEFA Champions League and UEFA Europa League ties and international FIFA World Cup and UEFA European Championship qualifiers. He continued his refereeing career after being elected to the Scottish Parliament, and the UK Parliament.

In the House of Commons Register of Members' Interests, Ross declared earnings of more than £2,700 in August and September 2017 for his work as an assistant referee. In October of that year, Ross told the football authorities that he would no longer accept refereeing appointments during the week while the UK Parliament is sitting. By December 2017 his declared income from 20 domestic and international games since becoming an MP was more than £11,000.

In December 2018, BBC Sport reported that Ross had reduced the number of refereeing appointments due to his work commitments as an MP. At this time, he also argued that the Scottish Football Association should not appoint fully professional referees.

In August 2020, Ross apologised for not attending a VJ Day event as a result of previously agreeing to officiate at a Scottish Premiership game between Kilmarnock and St Johnstone. Ross said he would donate his match fee to the charity Help for Heroes. In October 2020, he was a linesman at Wembley for England's 3–0 friendly win against Wales.  
 
In November 2020, FIFA were asked to investigate a complaint by a member of the Scottish Football Supporters Association that a Conservative Party leaflet distributed to homes in Scotland included a photograph of Ross as a match official.

Ross stopped officiating games in January 2021 due to injury. He resumed his refereeing career in July 2022, while both Holyrood and Westminster were in recess.

Personal life
Ross married his wife, Krystle, in 2015. They have two sons, one who was born in 2019, and another in 2021.

Notes

References

External links

 

1983 births
Living people
Conservative MSPs
Members of the Parliament of the United Kingdom for Scottish constituencies
Members of the Scottish Parliament 2016–2021
Members of the Scottish Parliament 2021–2026
People educated at Forres Academy
Politicians from Aberdeen
Alumni of Scotland's Rural College
Scottish Conservative Party councillors
Scottish Conservative Party MPs
Leaders of the Scottish Conservative Party
Scottish football referees
UK MPs 2017–2019
UK MPs 2019–present
Scottish Professional Football League referees